Wojciech Świdziniewski (26 July 1975 – 17 September 2009) born in Białystok, is a Polish fantasy writer and columnist. His first short story, The Consecrated (Konsekrowany), was published in Fantastyka, Poland's leading fantasy literary magazine, in 1999. His another short stories were published in Polish magazine Science Fiction, ezine Fahrenheit and fanzine WIDOK z Wysokiego Zamku. His short story The Stone-Masons (Murarze) was nominated for Janusz A. Zajdel Award, in 2001. Świdziniewski died on 17 September 2009 about month before publishing his first fantasy novel Troubles in Hamdirholm (Kłopoty w Hamdirholm).

References

1975 births
2009 deaths
Polish fantasy writers
Polish science fiction writers
Place of death missing
People from Białystok
Artists from Białystok